Simona Cavallari may refer to:

 Simona Cavallari (actress) (born 1971), Italian actress
 Simona Cavallari (handballer) (born 1992), Swiss handballer